"Edge of Seventeen" is a song by the American singer and songwriter Stevie Nicks from her debut solo studio album Bella Donna (1981), released as the third single from the album on February 4, 1982. The lyrics were written by Nicks to express the grief resulting from the death of her uncle Jonathan and the murder of John Lennon during the same week of December 1980. The song features a distinctive, chugging 16th-note guitar riff, drum beat and a simple chord structure typical of Nicks' songs. The song's title for the single release was "Edge of Seventeen (Just Like the White Winged Dove)". In the United States, "Edge of Seventeen" just missed out on the top 10 of the Billboard Hot 100, peaking at No. 11. Despite this, it became one of Nicks' most enduring and recognizable songs and has been covered by several artists. In 2021, it was listed at No. 217 on Rolling Stone's "The 500 Greatest Songs of All Time".

Background and inspiration 
According to Nicks, the title came from a conversation she had with Tom Petty's first wife, Jane, about the couple's first meeting. Jane said they met "at the age of seventeen", but Jane's strong Southern accent made it sound like "edge of seventeen" to Nicks. She liked the sound of the phrase so much that she told Jane she would write a song for it and give her credit for the inspiration.

Although Nicks had originally planned to use the title for a song about Tom and Jane Petty, the death of her uncle Jonathan and the murder of John Lennon during the same week of December 1980 inspired a new song for which Nicks used the title. Nicks' producer and lover Jimmy Iovine was a close friend of Lennon, and Nicks felt helpless to comfort him. Soon after, Nicks flew home to Phoenix, Arizona, to be with her uncle Jonathan, who was dying of cancer. She remained with her uncle and his family until his death.

Nicks had never actually heard a dove's call before, as she revealed in 2020 when she had only just heard it recently. The opening lyrics were inspired by a menu she was reading at a Phoenix restaurant in 1980, which said, "The white wing dove sings a song that sounds like she’s singing ooh, ooh, ooh. She makes her home here in the great Saguaro cactus that provides shelter and protection for her…".

Composition and lyrics 
Throughout the song, a distinctive 16th note guitar riff is played by Waddy Wachtel, progressing through C, D, and E-minor chords. During the bridge, the chords alternate twice between E-minor and C. Wachtel claimed that The Police's "Bring On the Night" was the inspiration for the riff.

As is typical of Nicks' songs, the lyrics are highly symbolic. Nicks has said that the white-winged dove represents the spirit leaving the body on death, and some of the verses capture her experience of the days leading up to her uncle Jonathan's death.

Reception
Record World praised the song for its "powerful lyrics, a percolating rhythm section and Stevie's throaty vocal."

Chart performance 
"Edge of Seventeen" peaked at No. 11 on the US Billboard Hot 100 for two weeks in April 1982. The live version on the B-side reached No. 26 on Billboards Mainstream Rock chart. The original album version of the song had previously made the top five of Billboards Mainstream Rock chart in 1981, peaking at No. 4. "Edge of Seventeen" also peaked at No. 11 on the RPM Top 100 Singles chart in Canada.

The song was also covered on season 9 of The Voice by Amanda Ayala and Shelby Brown. Their cover entered the top 100 of the iTunes rock chart.

The song entered the UK chart in 2021 following its use in a John Lewis commercial.

Track listing and formats 
 US 7" vinyl single
 "Edge of Seventeen (Just Like the White Winged Dove)"  – 4:10
 "Edge of Seventeen" (Previously unreleased live version)  – 5:57

Personnel 
Musicians
Stevie Nicks – lead vocals, writer
Waddy Wachtel – guitar
Bob Glaub – bass guitar
Russ Kunkel – drums
Bobbye Hall – percussion
Benmont Tench – organ
Roy Bittan – piano
Lori Perry – backing vocals
Sharon Celani – backing vocals
Production
Jimmy Iovine – producer

Charts

Certifications

Covers 
The distinctive riff from the song was sampled by the American girl group Destiny's Child in their 2001 hit single "Bootylicious", with Nicks making a cameo appearance in the accompanying music video.
Lindsay Lohan released a version of "Edge of Seventeen" on her second studio album A Little More Personal (Raw) (2005).
Audiomachine released a version of "Edge of Seventeen" on their album Trailerized: Covers and Originals (2018).
In 2020, Miley Cyrus interpolated the song for her single "Midnight Sky", which was later remixed as a mashup featuring Nicks titled "Edge of Midnight".

References

External links 
 Stevie Nicks on "Edge of Seventeen" — Quotes by Nicks about the song, gathered from interviews throughout the years.

1981 songs
1982 singles
Stevie Nicks songs
Songs written by Stevie Nicks
Song recordings produced by Jimmy Iovine
Songs about John Lennon
Commemoration songs
Lindsay Lohan songs
Modern Records (1980) singles